The Rotorua City Geothermal Energy Empowering Act 1967 is an Act to enable the Rotorua City Council to make provisions for the control of the tapping and use of geothermal energy in the city of Rotorua, New Zealand.

External links  

Statutes of New Zealand
Environmental law in New Zealand
1967 in the environment
1967 in New Zealand law
Rotorua
Geothermal energy
Energy in New Zealand